This article presents detail of the results in the 2005 Japan general election, breaking down results by block district. The 11 block districts elected 180 members by proportional representation (allocated to party lists in each block by the D'Hondt method), and 300 members were elected from single-member districts distributed among the 47 prefectures.

Five parties qualified to submit lists in each of the block districts. These were the New Kōmeitō Party, the Democratic Party of Japan, the Japan Communist Party, the Liberal Democratic Party, and the Social Democratic Party. In addition, the People's New Party, the New Party Japan, and Shintō Daichi submitted lists in some blocks but not others, while many independents competed in the single member districts with members of all eight of these parties.



In each table, the second column shows the number of the seats the party won in a single-member district, the third does that in proportional representation along with the number of votes and the percentage, and the fourth does the total numbers of the seats for the party, with the change from the previous election.

Party names are abbreviated as follows:
 LDP - Liberal Democratic Party
 DPJ - Democratic Party of Japan
 Kōmeitō - New Kōmeitō Party
 JCP - Japan Communist Party
 SDP - Social Democratic Party
 NPJ - New Party Japan
 PNP - People's New Party

National summary 

1 These parties submitted party lists only in selected districts, which should be considered when examining their share of the nationwide vote.

The source is at Asahi Shimbun.

Hokkaidō Block

Hokkaidō was the only region where the DPJ outperformed the LDP, gaining one single member district from the LDP while losing a proportional seat to Shintō Daichi (New Party  Great Earth), a new political organization. Shintō Daichi, which competed only in Hokkaidō and only in the proportional constituency, was established by former LDP power broker Muneo Suzuki, who resigned during a bribery scandal that resulted in a prison sentence for him. Suzuki's local popularity allowed Shinto Daichi to come in third, electing him as the top member of the proportional list.

Tōhoku Block

Although the LDP lost some vote to the People's New Party in Tōhoku, it appears to have gained some of that back at the DPJ's expense. While independent LDP rebel Hosei Norota held Akita district #2 against an LDP challenger, the LDP gained two Miyagi seats from the DPJ in the area of Sendai, Tōhoku's largest city.

Kitakantō Block

The LDP maintained its previous grip on the rural prefectures, losing only one district in Ibaraki Prefecture where independent Kishiro Nakamura, a former LDP construction minister who was previously convicted in a bribery scandal, returned to politics and defeated the LDP's Keiko Nagaoka, wife of the deceased incumbent. In the suburbs of Saitama Prefecture, the LDP took five seats from the DPJ and held the #11 seat of unaffiliated rebel Ryuji Koizumi.

Tokyo Block

With a 9% swing in the list vote, the LDP made huge gains in urban Tokyo, changing the single-member district map from a 12-12 split with the DPJ to a 23-1 rout. Only former DPJ leader Naoto Kan held his district. The ruling coalition also held off two rebels in districts #10, where 'assassin' and Environment Minister Yuriko Koike defeated a rebel incumbent, and #12, where rebel Eita Yashiro failed in his attempt to embarrass the LDP by running against coalition partner Kōmeitō's candidate.

In the proportional constituency, the LDP failed to submit a long enough list (perhaps electing more of their members from single-seat districts than expected), and thus did not receive one of the seats to which their vote total would have qualified them. This seat went to the SDP.

Minamikantō Block

While two independent LDP rebels held their seats in rural Yamanashi Prefecture, the LDP made dramatic gains against the DPJ in the urban and suburban areas of Kanagawa and Chiba Prefectures. In Kanagawa, of nine seats won by the DPJ in 2003, the LDP captured eight and independent Kenji Eda captured the ninth in a close three-way race, while in Chiba, the LDP reduced the DPJ from eight seats to one. The current youngest Diet member of Japan Taizō Sugimura was also elected in this region.

Hokurikushinetsu Block

In the mostly rural Hokuriku-shin'etsu block, the results were mostly static, with the LDP capturing one DPJ seat around Kanazawa in Ishikawa Prefecture and holding Fukui #1 against a rebel, but losing the seat of postal rebel and People's New Party leader Tamisuke Watanuki in Toyama Prefecture, with the PNP also retaining a proportional seat.

Tōkai Block

In Aichi Prefecture, the LDP gained four single-seat districts ringing Nagoya, often considered the DPJ's heartland. In Mie Prefecture, there was no change, while in less urban Shizuoka Prefecture the LDP took a seat from the DPJ and held off a postal rebel. In Gifu Prefecture rebels Seiko Noda and Keiji Furuya held their seats against candidates backed by the LDP leadership.

Kinki Block

In the outer parts of Kansai, the LDP made minor gains, gaining capturing one DPJ seat each in Shiga and Nara. In the urban core of Osaka, the LDP gained seven seats from the DPJ for a total of thirteen as opposed to the DPJ's two, while in the neighboring Hyōgo Prefecture the LDP took all three of the DPJ's former seats.

Chūgoku Block

In Chūgoku, a traditional stronghold of the LDP, postal rebels gained at the expense of both major parties. While the DPJ traded two seats in Yamaguchi and Hiroshima for two seats in Okayama, the LDP also lost seats held by postal rebels Shizuka Kamei (PNP) and Takeo Hiranuma (Independent), with Hisaoki Kamei (PNP) also taking a proportional seat after being defeated in a Shimane district.

Shikoku Block

In Shikoku, the least populous of Japan's four main islands, the LDP largely maintained its traditional grip, losing only one seat held by rebel Shunichi Yamaguchi in Tokushima Prefecture. The DPJ held onto its sole seat in Tokushima as well.

Kyūshū Block

In Kyūshū's most heavily populated prefecture, Fukuoka, the LDP gained four seats from the DPJ, which was left with only one, while losing a single seat to a postal rebel. In the hinterland of Kyūshū, the LDP fared worse, losing two seats each in Miyazaki and Saga and one more in Kagoshima to rebels, although gaining the DPJ's sole seat in Saga. In Okinawa, Kōmeitō lost its district to Independent Mikio Shimoji, who left the LDP in 2003 because it had prevented him from running against its coalition partner.

Sources
 Asahi Shimbun

2005 elections in Japan
General elections in Japan
Election results in Japan